Edward Dowse (1582–1648) was an English politician who sat in the House of Commons  from 1640 to 1648.

Dowse matriculated at Hart Hall, Oxford aged 15 on 14 October 1597,  and was awarded BA on 8 May 1601 and MA on 8 May 1604. He was  incorporated  at Cambridge University in 1616.

In 1625 he was elected Member of Parliament for  Cricklade, and in April 1626 for Chichester. In April 1640 he was again elected for  Chichester in the Short Parliament. He was elected MP for Portsmouth in the Long Parliament in November 1640.
 
Dowse died in 1648.

References

 

1580s births
1648 deaths
Alumni of Hart Hall, Oxford
Place of birth missing
Members of the Parliament of England (pre-1707) for Portsmouth
English MPs 1625
English MPs 1626
English MPs 1640 (April)
English MPs 1640–1648
Members of the Parliament of England (pre-1707) for Cricklade